David John Rozumek (born April 25, 1954) is a former American football linebacker who played four seasons with the Kansas City Chiefs of the National Football League. He was drafted by the Kansas City Chiefs in the 15th round of the 1976 NFL Draft. He played college football at the University of New Hampshire and attended Lawrence High School in Lawrence, Massachusetts.

References

External links
Just Sports Stats

Living people
1954 births
Players of American football from Massachusetts
American football linebackers
New Hampshire Wildcats football players
Kansas City Chiefs players
Sportspeople from Lawrence, Massachusetts